Stenoptilia harhorina is a moth of the family Pterophoridae. It is found in Mongolia (Kharkhorin mountains and Ulanbator West).

The wingspan is 15–16 mm. The forewings are brown with a slight red shine. Adults are on wing from July to August.

References

Moths described in 2003
harhorina
Moths of Asia